Pietro Algeri (born 2 October 1950) is an Italian former cyclist. He competed in the team pursuit event at the 1972 Summer Olympics.

References

External links
 

1950 births
Living people
Italian male cyclists
Olympic cyclists of Italy
Cyclists at the 1972 Summer Olympics
Cyclists from Bergamo
20th-century Italian people